Sweetwater High School may refer to:
 Sweetwater High School (National City, California)
 Sweetwater High School (Texas), Sweetwater, Texas
 Sweetwater High School (Sweetwater, Tennessee)
 Sweet Water High School (Sweet Water, Alabama)